Erythromelanosis follicularis faciei et colli is an erythematous pigmentary disease involving the follicles, characterized by a reddish-brown, sharply demarcated, symmetrical discoloration involving the preauricular and maxillary regions.

See also 
 Pigmentatio reticularis faciei et colli
 List of cutaneous conditions

References

Conditions of the skin appendages